Anae is a surname of Samoan origin. 

Notable people with the surname Anae include:

Albert Anae (born 1989), New Zealand-Australian Rugby League player
Arthur Anae (born 1945), New Zealand politician
Brad Anae (born 1957), American football defensive end
Bradlee Anae (born 1998), American football defensive end
Robert Anae, offensive coordinator and offensive line coach for the University of Virginia football team 
Tumua Anae (born 1988), American water polo goalie

See also 
 The Atlas of North American English

Samoan-language surnames